Solidarity Sweden-Latin America is a Swedish solidarity organization that works together with popular movements in Latin America to achieve a fair and sustainable society. 

In Swedish the name of the organization is Latinamerikagrupperna and in Spanish it is Solidaridad Suecia-América Latina.

References

External links
Official home page

Non-profit organizations based in Sweden